The two-factor model of personality is a widely used psychological factor analysis measurement of personality, behavior and temperament. It most often consists of a matrix measuring the factor of introversion and extroversion with some form of people versus task orientation.

Beginnings
The Roman physician Galen mapped the four temperaments (sanguine, phlegmatic, choleric and melancholic) to a matrix of hot/cold and dry/wet, taken from the four classical elements. Two of these temperaments, sanguine and choleric, shared a common trait: quickness of response (corresponding to "heat"), while the melancholic and phlegmatic shared the opposite, a longer response (coldness). The melancholic and choleric, however, shared a sustained response (dryness), and the sanguine and phlegmatic shared a short-lived response (wetness). This meant that the choleric and melancholic both would tend to hang on to emotions like anger, and thus appear more serious and critical than the fun-loving sanguine, and the peaceful phlegmatic. However, the choleric would be characterized by quick expressions of anger (like the sanguine, with the difference being that the sanguine cools off); while the melancholic would build up anger slowly, silently, before exploding. Also, the melancholic and sanguine would be sort of "opposites", as the choleric and phlegmatic, since they have opposite traits.

These are the basis of the two factors that would define temperament in the modern theory.

Development
In the last few centuries, various psychologists would begin expressing the four temperaments in terms of pairs of behaviors that were held in common by two temperaments each.

Ivan Pavlov (1849–1936), from his work with dogs, came up with the factors of "passivity" (active or passive) and "extremeness" (extreme response or moderate response). His view of the temperaments in dogs was:
 The Melancholic type (Weak inhibitory): categorized as "weak" dogs;
 Choleric type (Strong excitatory): strong, unbalanced, easily aroused (excitable);
 Sanguine type (Lively): strong, balanced, mobile;
 Phlegmatic type (Calm imperturbable): strong, balanced, sluggish.

This theory would also be extended to humans.

Alfred Adler (1879–1937) measured "activity" (connected with "energy") against "social interest", yielding the four "styles of life":
 Ruling or Dominant type: high activity, low social interest
 Getting or Leaning type: low activity, high social interest
 Avoiding type: low activity, low social interest
 Socially Useful type: high activity, high social interest

These he compared to the choleric, phlegmatic, melancholic and sanguine respectively.

Erich Fromm's (1900–1980) factors were acquiring and assimilating things ("assimilation"), and reacting to people ("socialization"). These two factors form four types of character, which he calls Receptive, Exploitative, Hoarding and Marketing.

Also deserving mention is a single scale invented in the 1940s by Karen Horney (1885–1952). This one dimension measured "movement" towards, against and away from people. This would result in the coping strategies, in which these three "neurotic" patterns would be paired with a fourth, "healthy" one called "movement with people". These would describe behaviors associated with both extroversion and reacting to people, in which people attempt to avoid getting hurt, by either distancing themselves from others or maintaining self-sufficiency and independence on one hand; or approaching others, attempting to control or exploit them, and otherwise gain power and recognition; or "give in" to them to gain acceptance and approval, on the other.

Factors integrated into modern instruments
As the twentieth century progressed, numerous other instruments were devised measuring not only temperament, but also various individual aspects of personality and behavior, and several began using forms of extroversion and the developing category of people versus task focus as the factors.

In 1928, William Moulton Marston identified four primary emotions, each with an initial feeling tone of either pleasantness or unpleasantness. This led to his viewing people's behavior along two axes, with their attention being either "passive" or "active", depending on the individual's perception of his or her environment as either "favorable" or "antagonistic". By placing the axes at right angles, four quadrants form with each describing a behavioral pattern:
 Dominance, which produces activity in an antagonistic environment; with a feeling of unpleasantness until stimulus is acted upon
 Compliance, which produces passivity in an antagonistic environment; with a feeling of unpleasantness until stimulus is reconciled
 Inducement, which produces activity in a favorable environment; with a feeling of pleasantness increasing as interaction increases
 Submission, which produces passivity in a favorable environment; with a feeling of pleasantness increasing as yielding increases

This would be further developed in the 1970s by John G. Geier into the DiSC assessment System, which grades individual scales of "Dominance", "Influence", "Steadiness", and "Conscientiousness". By now, it would be classified in terms of the two factors; consisting of pairs of Extroverted or "Assertive" aspects (D, I), Introverted or "Passive" aspects (S, C), Task-oriented or "Controlled" aspects (D, C) and social or "Open" aspects (I, S).

The California Psychological Inventory's CPI 260 Instrument also has similar scales, of "Initiates action, Confident in social situations" versus "Focuses on inner life, Values own privacy"; and "Rule-favoring, Likes stability, Agrees with others" versus "Rule-questioning, Has personal value system, Often disagrees with others" and the four "lifestyles": Leader, Supporter, Innovator, and Visualizer.

Two-Factors expanded to measure more than four types
Galen also had intermediate scales for "balance" between the hot/cold and wet/dry poles, yielding a total of nine temperaments. Four were the original humors, and five were balanced in one or both scales.

Another addition to the two factor models was the creation of a 10 by 10 square grid developed by Robert R. Blake and Jane Mouton in their Managerial Grid Model introduced in 1964. This matrix graded, from 0–9, the factors of "Concern for Production" (X-axis) and "Concern for People" (Y-axis), allowing a moderate range of scores, which yielded five "leadership styles":
 Impoverished (low X, Y)
 Produce or Perish (high X low Y)
 Country Club (low X high Y)
 Team (high X and Y)
 Middle of the Road (moderate X, Y)

The Thomas Kilmann Conflict Mode Instrument (TKI) used a version of this with "Assertiveness" and "Cooperativeness" as the two factors, also leading to a fifth mode:
 Competing, (assertive, uncooperative)
 Avoiding (unassertive, uncooperative)
 Accommodating (unassertive, cooperative)
 Collaborating (assertive, cooperative)
 Compromising (intermediate assertiveness and cooperativeness).

FIRO-B would call the two dimensions Expressed Behavior and Wanted Behavior, and use three separate matrices for the respective areas of Inclusion (social skills) Control (leadership and responsibility-taking) and Affection (deep personal relationships). In 1977, "locator charts" were produced for each area by Dr. Leo Ryan, providing a map of the various scores, following the Managerial Grid model, with unofficial names assigned to different score ranges. They were generally grouped into five main types for each area, in the vein of the Managerial Grid and TKI, except that moderate scores (generally 4, 5) in only one dimension (with the other dimension being high or low) were given separate names, creating nine basic groups for each area (low e/w, low e/high w, low e/moderate w, etc.). In the control area, there is a tenth group created by a further division of the low e/high w range.

This would form the basis of the Five Temperaments theory by Dr. Richard G. and Phyllis Arno, in which the ancient temperaments were mapped to the FIRO-B scales (in all three areas), with Phlegmatic becoming the moderate e/w instead of low e/high w, which was now taken to constitute a fifth temperament called "Supine", which has many of the "introverted and relationship oriented" traits of the other types defined as such, above. (The "Wanted behavior" scale is generally renamed "Responsive behavior"). The moderate scores mixed with high or low are designated "Phlegmatic blends" and divided with 4 being a blend of Phlegmatic with the lower adjacent temperament, and 5 being a blend with the higher adjacent temperament. This results in 13 separate ranges in each area.

Other factor pairs
Other factors devised along the way measured other aspects of personality, mostly cognitive aspects. This would form a second strain of temperament theory, one which enjoys the most popularity today.

Immanuel Kant (1724–1804) defined his typology by a duality of the beautiful and sublime, and concluded it was possible to represent the four temperaments with a square of opposition using the presence or absence of the two attributes. He determined that the phlegmatic type has no interest in either the beautiful or the sublime, so there was an absence of both (sb). The melancholic had a feeling for both (SB), and the sanguine had a predominating feeling for the beautiful (sB), while the choleric, he determined after comparing with the melancholic, lacked a sense of beauty and had only a sense of the sublime (Sb).

Hans Eysenck (1916–1997) was one of the first psychologists to analyze personality differences using a psycho-statistical method (factor analysis), and his research led him to believe that temperament is biologically based. In his book Dimensions of Personality (1947) he paired Extraversion (E), which was "the tendency to enjoy positive events", especially social ones, with Neuroticism (N), which was the tendency to experience negative emotions. By pairing the two dimensions, Eysenck noted how the results were similar to the four ancient temperaments.
 High N, High E = Choleric
 High N, Low E = Melancholy (also called "Melancholic")
 Low N, High E = Sanguine
 Low N, Low E = Phlegmatic

He later added a third dimension, psychoticism, resulting in his "P-E-N" three factor model of personality. This has been correlated with two separate factors developed by the Big Five personality traits (Five Factor Model), called "agreeableness" and "conscientiousness"; the former being similar to the people/task orientation scale elaborated above. Neuroticism in Eysenck's case acted like the people/task-orientation scale (except for being inverted as to which temperaments were "high" or "low"), but was later separated as a distinct factor in the Big Five.

Carl Jung, in the early 20th century, introduced the four factors that would become a part of the later MBTI, and these included extroversion/introversion, sensing and intuition, and thinking/feeling, which would be correlated to Agreeableness, with Judging-Perceiving roughly as Conscientiousness.

Ernst Kretschmer (1888–1964) divided personality into two "constitutional groups": Schizothymic, which contain a "Psychaesthetic proportion" between sensitive and cold poles, and Cyclothymic which contain a "Diathetic" proportion between gay and sad. The Schizoids consist of the Hyperesthetic (sensitive) and Anesthetic (Cold) characters, and the Cycloids consist of the Depressive (or "melancholic") and Hypomanic characters.

David W. Keirsey would make the connection of the two groups with Myers' Sensors and iNtuitors, providing the two factors for his four temperaments. He would rename Sensing to "Observant" or "Concrete", and Intuiting to "Introspection" or "Abstract", and pair it with "Cooperative" versus "Pragmatic" (or "Utilitarian") which would be the "Conscientiousness" scale; to form:
 SP Artisan (Concrete, Pragmatic)
 SJ Guardian (Concrete, Cooperative)
 NT Rational (Abstract, Pragmatic)
 NF Idealist (Abstract, Cooperative)

Keirsey also divided his temperaments by "Role-Informative"/"Role Directive" to form eight "intelligence types"; and finally by E/I, to yield the 16 types of the MBTI. It was when his former student, Berens, paired the latter two factors separately that she yielded here Interaction Styles, discussed above. Keirsey also divided the intelligence types by I/E into "roles of interaction".

The Enneagram of Personality would map its nine types to a matrix, whose scales are "Surface Direction" and "Deep Direction". These are similar to Extroversion and people/task-orientation, but instead of the types being plotted on a scale of 0–9, Horney's original three grades of "towards", "away", and "against" were retained, and now used in both dimensions (graded respectively, as "+", "0" and "-"). This changes the criteria, as the "moderate" (0) grade is considered "away", but this does not necessarily correspond to the moderate extroversion or agreeableness scores of the other instruments.

Table of theories and instruments neither using scales explicitly nor recognizing a moderate temperament

Table of theories and instruments not recognizing a moderate temperament

Table of theories and instruments compared to using "Concrete"/Abstract" (Sensing/Intuitive) and "Cooperative"/"Pragmatic"

Table of theories and instruments using Hippocrates' four humours but not recognizing a moderate temperament

Table of theories and instruments using Hippocrates' four humours

Classical elements c. 450 BC

Table of theories and instruments using extroversion and people-task-orientation

William Schutz, Fundamental Interpersonal Relations Orientation-B 

In 1977, a clinical psychologist who worked with FIRO-B, Dr. Leo Ryan, produced maps of the scores for each area, called "locator charts", and assigned names for all of the score ranges in his Clinical Interpretation of The FIRO-B:

Enneagram

See also
California Psychological Inventory

References

Personality theories
Personality typologies